Maelduin of Aughrim, Bishop and Erenagh of Aughrim, County Galway, died 809.

Maelduin is the last recorded bishop of Aughrim in the Irish annals. He is also noted as its Erenagh in his obituary. Events which occurred during his lifetime included:

 783 - The law of Ciaran was promulgated among the Connaughtmen.
 785 - Council of Paderborn; battles of Ath Rois and Cluain Milain
 791 - Death of Duineachaidh ua Daire, King of Ciarraighe Magh Ai
 793 - Lindisfarne, and Inis Padraig, attacked by Vikings, and they bore away the shrine of Dochonna.
 797 - Aedh Oirdnidhe divides Mide between Conchubhar and Ailill mac Donnchadha
 805 - Muirgius mac Tommaltaig destroys Luighne in revenge for the murder of two of his sons

References

 Annals of Ulster at CELT: Corpus of Electronic Texts at University College Cork
 Annals of Tigernach at CELT: Corpus of Electronic Texts at University College Cork
Revised edition of McCarthy's synchronisms at Trinity College Dublin.
 Byrne, Francis John (2001), Irish Kings and High-Kings, Dublin: Four Courts Press, 
 Lysaght, Eamonn (1978), The Surnames of Ireland. , pp.233-34.

People from County Galway
8th-century Irish bishops
809 deaths
Year of birth unknown
9th-century Irish bishops